Prisopodidae is a family of stick insects belonging to the suborder Verophasmatodea and superfamily Aschiphasmatoidea; they can be found in Central and South America, South Africa, India, Indo-China and Malesia.

Genera
The Catalogue of Life and Phasmida Species File list:

Subfamily Korinninae Günther, 1953
 Kalocorinnis Günther, 1944 (Borneo, peninsular Malaysia, Sumatra)
 Korinnis Günther, 1932 (India, Indo-China, Malesia)
Subfamily Prisopodinae Brunner von Wattenwyl, 1893
 Damasippus Stål, 1875 (South America)
 Dinelytron Gray, 1835 (Brazil)
 Melophasma Redtenbacher, 1906 (South America)
 Paraprisopus Redtenbacher, 1906 (South America)
 Prisopus Peletier de Saint Fargeau & Serville, 1827 (Central & South America)

References

External links

Phasmatodea families